Supermind may refer to:
Supermind (Integral yoga) in philosophy of Sri Aurobindo
"Professor Supermind and Son", a comics feature from the 1940s
Supermind (novel), a science fiction novel by A. E. van Vogt from 1979